The Church of the Redeemer is the oldest Moravian Church building in Kingston, Jamaica, and houses a congregation of the Jamaican province of the Moravian Church. It was opened in 1918. The name, which is unusual for a Moravian church, was bestowed by its builder Jonathan Reinke "because he did not want people to speak of Reinke's church".

History

First building
Kingston's first Moravian Church (at 23 Hanover Street) was a large house which was adapted for the purpose and consecrated on 1893-04-14. This building and the Mission House next door (at 25 Hanover Street) were destroyed in 1907 by an earthquake. Two shed's were erected to replace them while a new Church building was constructed.

Present building
The building at the corner of North Street and Duke Street was consecrated by Bishop Westphal on 1918-05-08. The total cost of the building, site and out buildings was £3,124.

Manse
A new manse, on the north side of North Street a block to the east, was completed in 1927 at a cost of £921. The manse site was sold to the Gleaner Company for £4,000 in 1949 and a new manse purchased in Antrim Road, Vineyard Town.

Hall

A church hall was opened on 1930-12-30 by Lady Stubbs, wife of the Governor. This was destroyed by the hurricane of 1951. A replacement hall was opened in 1962-02-28 at a cost of £16,000.

Organ
A pipe organ was installed in 1932, reconstructed in 1945 and destroyed during the 1951 hurricane. A replacement was installed in 1953 at a cost of over £3,000.

Clergy

Notes and references

Bibliography

External links
Aerial view of the church.
Aerial view of the site of the 1927 manse.
Aerial view of the site of the 1949 manse.

Congregations of Jamaica Province of the Moravian Church
Moravian churches in Jamaica
1918 establishments in the British Empire
Churches completed in 1918